"Gettin' It" is a song by American hip hop recording artist Too Short. The song was released on 1996 as the first single of his seventh studio album Gettin' It (Album Number Ten), with the record labels Jive Records. The song was produced by Shorty B. Coolio and Ice-T made cameos in the music video.

Track listing 
CD Single
Gettin’ It (Video Version) (featuring Parliament-Funkadelic) — 4:55
Gettin’ It (Radio Version) (featuring Parliament-Funkadelic) — 4:25
Gettin’ It (LP Version) (featuring Parliament-Funkadelic) — 5:29

Charts

References

1996 singles
1996 songs
Too Short songs
Funkadelic songs
Jive Records singles
Songs written by Too Short
Songs written by George Clinton (funk musician)